Marlboro Jewish Center (Congregation Ohev Shalom), in Marlboro, New Jersey, is a Conservative Jewish synagogue. It has been opened since 1970. Current spiritual leaders are Rabbi Michael Pont and Cantor Michelle Teplitz. This congregation has contributed to the community as a top USY chapter in all of New Jersey.

References

External links

Buildings and structures in Monmouth County, New Jersey
Conservative synagogues in New Jersey
Marlboro Township, New Jersey
Jewish organizations established in 1971
1971 establishments in New Jersey